This is a list of the 68 bairros (neighborhoods) and seven sectors of Coronel Fabriciano, Minas Gerais, Brazil.

List

References

External links

  Prefeitura de Coronel Fabriciano The official website of Coronel Fabriciano.

Coronel Fabriciano
Neighborhoods of Coronel Fabriciano
Neighbourhoods